Pir Morad (also Romanized as Pīr Morād) is a village in Beyranvand-e Shomali Rural District, Bayravand District, Khorramabad County, Lorestan Province, Iran. At the 2006 census, its population was 19, in 5 families.

References 

Towns and villages in Khorramabad County